Rudolf Felder (2 May 1842 in Vienna – 29 March 1871 in Vienna) was an Austrian jurist and entomologist. He was mainly interested in Lepidoptera, amassing, with his father, Cajetan Felder, a huge collection.

Works
with Cajetan Felder, Lepidopterologische Fragmente. Wiener Entomologische Monatschrift 3:390–405. (1859)
Lepidopterorum Amboinensium a Dre L. Doleschall annis 1856 - 1868 collectorum species novae, diagnostibus collustratae. Sitzungsberichten der k. Akademie der Wissenschaften zu Wien, Jahr. (1860 or 1861).
with Cajetan Felder and Alois Friedrich Rogenhofer Reise der österreichischen Fregatte Novara um die Erde. . . .. Zool. Theil. Vol. 2, Part 2. Lepidoptera. (Vienna) (1865).

References
 Schiner, J.R., 1872: Rudolph Felder. Ein Nachruf. Verhandlungen der kaiserlich-königlichen zoologisch-botanischen Gesellschaft in Wien, 22: 41-50.
 Anonym 1871: [Felder, R.]  Petites nouvelles entomologiques. 1(30):122
 Gilbert, P. 2000: Butterfly Collectors and Painters: Four Centuries of Colour Plates from The Library Collections of The Natural History Museum, London. - Singapore, Beaumont Publishing Pte Ltd.

Austrian lepidopterists
Scientists from Vienna
1842 births
1871 deaths